Teijsse is a surname. Notable people with the surname include:

Kenny Teijsse (born 1992), Dutch footballer
Yordi Teijsse (born 1992), Dutch footballer, Kenny's twin brother